Kneehigh Theatre was an international touring theatre company founded in 1980 by Mike Shepherd and based in Cornwall, England. The company was based in barns on the southern Cornish coast, at Gorran Haven, but the administration was in Truro. On 3 June 2021, Kneehigh announced it would close.

Overview
Kneehigh was started in 1980 by Mike Shepherd. Early productions were performed in village halls, marquees, cliff-tops and quarries. Their productions were often based around mythological tales such as the Hans Christian Andersen fairy-tale The Red Shoes, The Bacchae and the Cornish legend Tristan and Yseult. Their artistic director Emma Rice won Best Director 2002, Barclays Theatre Awards.

Their productions have been performed in locations such as Restormel Castle, Minack Theatre, National Theatre, Shakespeare's Globe, Royal Shakespeare Company and the Eden Project as well as their award-winning Asylum Season. They used a variety of theatrical elements including puppetry, live music (often played with folk instruments such as ukuleles and dulcimers) and an emphasis on visual imagery.

Between 1989 and 2006, Sue Hill and Bill Mitchell were working as part of Kneehigh on work that was happening outdoors and on site, influenced heavily by such groups as Footsbarn Theatre and Welfare State International. However, feeling that Kneehigh was pulling in two different directions, one based in studios and theatres, and the other based in the landscape, Hill and Mitchell formed their own company Wildworks. The first Wildworks productions were initially co-productions with Kneehigh until 2006 when they made Souterrain, their first independent production.

In the autumn of 2007, Kneehigh toured village halls in Cornwall with Blast! A Cornish Expose Performed by 3 Complete Idiots! and presented Noël Coward's Brief Encounter in Birmingham and at the West Yorkshire Playhouse in Leeds. After finishing a run of Brief Encounter at the Cinema Haymarket in the West End, the show toured the UK before going overseas to American Conservatory Theater in San Francisco, California, St. Ann's Warehouse in Brooklyn, and the Guthrie Theater in Minneapolis.

After that, Kneehigh took their work to the United States, Australia, New Zealand, China and Syria and other countries, whilst continuing to tour work in the UK. They were an associate company of Bristol Old Vic and Shakespeare's Globe in London.

Simon Harvey was resident associate director.

Productions

The Company
Although the company varied between productions, there were a number of associate artists who were repeatedly involved with Kneehigh including:
 Bec Applebee, Performer, Peer Gynt, Ship of Fools, Wind fall, The Bogus, Raven Heart, Wagstaffe the Wind Up Boy, Ghost Nets 1 and 2, Women who threw the Day away, The Three Island Project: The old Man with Enormous wings, Anybody like Me, Telling Tales, The King of Prussia, The Riot, Pandora's Box, The Red Shoes, The Wooden frock, RAA. 
 Simon Baker, sound designer.  Brief Encounter, Don John, The Wild Bride
 Stu Barker, performer, composer & musical director.  A Matter of Life and Death, Tristan & Yseult, Cubeline, Brief Encounter, Nights at the Circus, Rapunzel, The Bacchae, The Wooden Frock, Pandora's Box, The Red Shoes, The Itch, Roger Salmon, Don John, The Wild Bride
 Dominic Bilkey, sound designer. The Bacchae, Tristan & Yseult, Cymbeline, Rapunzel
 Jim Carey, performer & musical director. The Riot, Strange Cargo, The King of Prussia, Tregeagle, Ship of Fools, Peer Gynt, Windfall, Ting Tang Mine, The Bogus, Ravenheart, The Lost Stories of Don Quixote, The Arabian Nights
 Paul Crewes, producer.  The Bacchae, The Wooden Frock, Cymbeline, Rapunzel, Don John, The Wild Bride
 Gisli Orn Gardarsson, performer. A Matter of Life and Death, Nights at the Circus, Don John
 Carl Grose, performer & writer.  Performer: The King of Prussia, Strange Cargo, Wagstaffe the Wind-up Boy, Chucky Vs Alien, Nights at the Circus, Cymbeline, Blast!, Don John, Hansel & Gretel  Writer: Quicksilver, Tristan & Yseult, The Bacchae, Cymbeline, Hansel & Gretel, The Wild Bride
 Craig Johnson, performer.  Cry Wolf, Quicksilver, Skulduggery, Tristan & Yseult, The Bacchae, Cymbeline, A Matter of Life and Death, Blast!, Journey to the Centre of the Earth (which he also directed), Don John, Hansel & Gretel
 Amanda Lawrence, performer. The Wooden Frock Tristan & Yseult, Knights at the Circus, Brief Encounter
 Dom Lawton, performer & musician.  A Matter of Life and Death, Annabelle Lee, Cymbeline, Hanging Around, Don John
 Robert Luckay, performer.  The Bacchae, Cymbeline
 Jack Morrison. The Wooden Frock, Wagstaffe the Wind up Boy, The Bacchae, ,Journey to the Centre of the Earth, A Matter of Life and Death, Cymbeline, Rapunzel, Blast!, Don John, Tristan & Yseult
 Anna Maria Murphy, writer. Tristan & Yseult, The Bacchae, The Red Shoes, Skulduggery, Doubtful Island, Ghost Nets, Women Who Threw the Day Away, Telling Tales
 Dave Mynne, performer & founder member.  Don John
 Emma Rice, artistic director and performer. The Red Shoes, The Wooden Frock, The Bacchae, Tristan & Yseult, Nights at the Circus, Cymbeline, A Matter of Life and Death, Rapunzel, Brief Encounter, Don John, The Wild Bride.
 Malcolm Rippeth, lighting designer.  Brief Encounter, Cymbeline, Nights at the Circus, The Bacchae, Pandora's Box, Don John, The Wild Bride
 Ian Ross, musician.  Brief Encounter, Don John, Hansel and Gretel, The Red Shoes, The Wild Bride, Tristan and Yseult, Midnights Pumpkin, 946, Dead Dog in a Suitcase, The Flying Lovers of Vitebsk, Composer Hansel and Gretel,Very Old man with Enormous wings, the Flying Lovers of Vitebsk
 Mike Shepherd, performer and founder. The Red Shoes, The Wooden Frock, The Bacchae, A Matter of Life and Death, Cymbeline, Rapunzel, Blast!, Don John, Tristan & Yseult
 Tristan Sturrock, performer. Brief Encounter, A Matter of Life and Death, The Riot, Tristan and Yseult, The King of Prussia, Tregeagle, Ship of Fools, Peer Gynt, The Ashmaid, Danger My Ally, Windfall, Don John
 Michael Vale, designer. Rapunzel, Cymbeline
 Alex Wardle, lighting designer. Tristan & Yseult, Rapunzel, The Wooden Frock, The Riot, The Red Shoes
 Mary Woodvine, performer.  The Young Man of Cury, Windfall, King of Prussia, The Riot, Fishboy, Skullduggery, Don John
 Sarah Wright, puppet designer / director, performer. Wild Bride, Dead Dog in a Suitcase, 946, Tin Drum, Brief Encounter, Very Old Man With Enormous Wings.

References

External links

Official website
Kneehigh Theatre: in pictures from The Guardian
Troupe therapy, a Guardian article
BBC interview with Emma Rice, Artistic Director

1980 establishments in the United Kingdom
2021 disestablishments in the United Kingdom
Cornish culture
Physical theatre
Theatre companies in England